Tara Oram (born April 28, 1984) is a Canadian country music recording artist and TV personality.  She was a top six finalist on the fifth season of Canadian Idol in 2007. In 2009, Oram received the "Rising Star" Canadian Country Music Award and was nominated for a Juno Award, for Country Album of the Year, for her debut album Chasing the Sun.

Early life

Oram was born in Hare Bay, Newfoundland but moved frequently during her early years.  Oram first moved to the Malton area of Mississauga, Ontario when she was 10 years old, and later to Brampton, where she attended Bramalea Secondary School.

Career 

At age 16 Oram was signed to indie label Wellcraft Music Group and released her first country music single called, "More Than I Dreamed" which was her first top 50 hit.  She later toured with a local agency called Performerz, which allowed her to sing in theatres, malls and festivals throughout Ontario.  When 19 Oram joined her first real band, Big Catch.  The band played the bar/club circuit and corporate events around Ontario for the better part of four years, performing a mix of country, top 40, rock, R'n B and retro. In 2007, Oram auditioned for the hit show Canadian Idol, earning a 6th-place finish on the hit reality show. The next year, Oram signed her first major record deal with Open Road/Universal Music Canada and also appeared on reality TV series called, "The Tara Diaries" on CMT. CMT filmed a Christmas special she hosted, "The Night Before Christmas". In October 2008, Oram's first show as a signed artist was opening for her Idol, Marty Stuart in Halifax, Nova Scotia.

In 2009, CMT and YTV Oram appeared a celebrity judge on the TV series, "Karaoke Star Junior".

On July 10, 2010, Oram was the opening act for Taylor Swift and performed at the second annual Cavendish Beach Music Festival in Cavendish, Prince Edward Island, singing to a crowd of more than 35,000 people.

Oram became a judge on YTV's Canadian reality TV show, The Next Star since Season 5, which premiered July 18, 2012.

Awards/ and nominations
Oram received nominations for the 2009 East Coast Music Awards in the categories Female Solo Recording of the Year and Video of the Year, and won in the Country Recording of the Year award.   
She also received a CRMA (Canadian Radio Music Award) nomination as Best New Group/Solo Artist. 
On February 2, 2009 Oram was nominated for a Juno Award in the Country Recording of the Year category. 
Oram won the 2009 CCMA Rising Star award.  She was also nominated for Rising Star, Female Artist of the Year and Video of the Year.

In 2015, Tara Oram received a Star on Brampton's Walk of Fame.

Discography

Albums

Singles

Music videos

Awards and nominations

See also
Canadian Idol
Season 5 Recap of Canadian Idol

References

External links

Tara Oram's Management Company

1984 births
Living people
Canadian Idol participants
Canadian women country singers
Open Road Recordings artists
People from Gander, Newfoundland and Labrador
Canadian Country Music Association Rising Star Award winners
21st-century Canadian women singers